Antoine Griezmann (born 21 March 1991) is a French professional footballer who plays as a forward for La Liga club Atlético Madrid and the France national team. A versatile player, he is known for his attacking, passing and supportive defence, and has played as an attacking midfielder, winger, and striker in his career.

Griezmann began his senior club career with Real Sociedad, winning the Segunda División in his first season. In 2014, he joined Atlético Madrid for a then-club record €30 million and won the UEFA Europa League, the UEFA Super Cup, the Supercopa de España, and La Liga Best Player. He was nominated for the Ballon d'Or and Best FIFA Men's Player in 2016 and 2018. In 2019, Griezmann was the subject of a record association football transfer when he signed for rivals Barcelona in a transfer worth €120 million, becoming the fifth-most expensive player of all time. There, he won a Copa del Rey, before returning to Atlético Madrid in 2021, becoming the club's all-time third-highest goalscorer.

At international level, Griezmann won the 2010 UEFA European Under-19 Championship and made his senior debut for France in 2014 at age 22; he has since earned 117 caps, ranking as France's sixth-most capped player, and with over 40 goals scored, he is also the nation's third-highest all-time top goalscorer. He finished as top goalscorer and was Player of the Tournament as France finished runners-up at UEFA Euro 2016, and won the Silver Boot as the second highest goalscorer as France won the 2018 FIFA World Cup; he won the Bronze Ball as the tournament's third best player, and was also named Man of the Match in the final. In the 2022 FIFA World Cup, he was used in a central midfield role as the team finished runners-up.

Early life

Antoine Griezmann was born in the commune of Mâcon in the département of Saône-et-Loire. His father Alain Griezmann, a town councillor, is from a family who migrated to France from Münster, Germany in the first half of the 19th century. The family surname was originally spelled "Griesmann", before being changed to "Griezmann". His mother Isabelle Lopes, a former hospital staff member supervising the cleaning team, is of Portuguese descent, and her father Amaro Lopes was a Portuguese footballer for Paços de Ferreira. Amaro Lopes moved from Portugal to France with his wife Carolina to work in construction in 1957, where Isabelle was born, and he died in 1992 when his grandson was an infant. As a child, Griezmann often spent his holidays in Paços de Ferreira, Portugal.

Griezmann began his career playing for hometown club Mâcon. While there, he embarked on several trials with professional clubs in order to earn a spot in one of their youth academies, but was rejected because clubs questioned his size and lightweight frame. In 2005, while on trial with Montpellier, Griezmann played in a friendly match against the youth academy of Paris Saint-Germain in Paris, and impressed several clubs, notably Spanish club Real Sociedad, whose scouts were attending the event. Following the match, the club's officials offered Griezmann a one-week trial in San Sebastián, which he accepted. He was later offered a second-week stay at the club. The club then contacted his parents and formally offered the player a youth contract. Griezmann's parents were initially reluctant to have their son move to Spain, but allowed him to make the move after positive reassurances. Because Griezmann spent time at youth level in a Basque club, he is potentially available to play for Athletic Bilbao, in spite of being born and growing up in the non-Basque areas of France.

Club career

Real Sociedad

Early career
When he first arrived at Real Sociedad, Griezmann lodged with the club's French scout while attending school across the border in Bayonne, training in the evenings at the club's headquarters in San Sebastián. It took him time to break into Real Sociedad's first team, but after four years in the club's youth system he made his debut, called up by Martín Lasarte for Real Sociedad's 2009–10 pre-season campaign. In the pre-season, he scored five goals in four appearances and an injury to the team's regular left-winger led to Lasarte selecting him for the start of the season (unusually for a youth graduate, bypassing the reserve team altogether).

2009–11: Development and breakthrough
On 2 September 2009, Griezmann made his competitive debut in the team's Copa del Rey match against Rayo Vallecano appearing as a substitute in the 77th minute of a 2–0 defeat. Four days later, he made his league debut appearing as a substitute against Real Murcia. On 27 September, he made his first professional start and also scored his first professional goal against Huesca in a 2–0 win. Two weeks later, Griezmann scored his second goal of the campaign in a 2–0 win over Salamanca. In November 2009, he scored goals in back-to-back matches against Hércules and Recreativo de Huelva. The goal against the latter club was the only goal of the match. Griezmann appeared consistently in the team for the rest of the season, scoring two more goals in wins over Cádiz and Numancia as Real Sociedad earned promotion to La Liga for the 2010–11 season as league winners.

On 8 April 2010, Griezmann signed his first professional contract agreeing to a five-year deal with the club until 2015 with a release clause of €30 million. Prior to signing the contract, he drew considerable interest from Ligue 1 clubs Lyon, Saint-Étienne and Auxerre.

Griezmann made his debut in the Spanish first division on 29 August 2010, in the season's first match. In a post-game interview, he described the occasion as "fulfilling his childhood dream". In the team's first match after the September international break, Griezmann assisted on the equalising goal scored by Raúl Tamudo against Real Madrid. Madrid later won the match 2–1 following a goal from Cristiano Ronaldo. On 25 October, Griezmann scored his first goal in the league in a 3–0 victory over Deportivo de La Coruña. He celebrated the goal by pretending to drive a truck that was parked near the field. A week later, Griezmann scored the opening goal in a 2–1 win over Málaga. In November 2010, Griezmann scored the only goal in the team's 2–1 loss to Hércules. In the team's second match of the new year, he netted the second goal in the team's 4–0 victory over Getafe. After going scoreless in the next nine matches, Griezmann returned to his scoring form in March netting the only goal for Txuri-urdin in the team's 2–1 defeat to Racing Santander.

2011–14: Individual success
After sitting out the first league match of the 2011–12 campaign, in Griezmann's first competitive match of the season against the defending champions Barcelona two weeks later, he scored the equalising goal in a 2–2 draw.

In the final league game of the 2012–13 campaign, he scored the only goal of the game against Deportivo de La Coruña, securing qualification for the UEFA Champions League for the first time since 2003–04 while also relegating Deportivo.

At the start of the following season, Griezmann scored on a volley against Lyon in his home nation of France which helped Real Sociedad qualify for the Champions League group stage (4–0 on aggregate). Another important goal was also on a volley, this time against Athletic Bilbao in a Basque derby league match at Anoeta Stadium in January 2014 which ended in a 2–0 victory for Real.

Atlético Madrid

2014–17: Transfer and rise to prominence

On 28 July 2014, Atlético Madrid reached an agreement with Real Sociedad for the transfer of Griezmann, for a fee believed to be close to his €30 million (£24 million) buy-out clause. He passed the medical examination the same day and signed a six-year contract on 29 July.

Griezmann made his competitive debut in the first leg of the 2014 Supercopa de España on 19 August, a 1–1 draw away to Real Madrid, replacing Saúl after 57 minutes. On 17 September, he scored his first goal for the club, in a Champions League group stage match against Olympiacos, in a game which Atlético eventually lost 3–2. Griezmann netted a brace, his first league goals for the club, in a 4–2 win over Córdoba on 1 November. On 21 December 2014, he scored his first La Liga hat-trick as Atlético won 4–1 at Athletic Bilbao, having trailed at half-time. He was the La Liga Player of the Month for January 2015 despite appearing in only three of Atlético's five matches.

On 7 April 2015, Griezmann scored the second in a 2–0 home victory over Real Sociedad. Out of respect to his formative club, the celebrations were minimal. Two weeks later he scored a brace against Elche in a 3–0 home win, bringing him to a total of 22 goals in the league season, overtaking Karim Benzema for the highest total by a French player in a single Spanish top-division campaign. He finished the season with 22 goals in 37 games, and was selected as the only Atlético player and one of three forwards in the Team of the Year at the LFP Awards, alongside Cristiano Ronaldo and Lionel Messi.

On 22 August 2015, Griezmann scored the only goal as Atlético began the season with a home victory over promoted Las Palmas. He scored both of the goals on 15 September, as they won at Galatasaray in the Champions League group stage. A week later, he repeated the feat to defeat local neighbours Getafe and put Atlético on top of the league. On 18 October, in his return to Real Sociedad, Griezmann chipped goalkeeper Gerónimo Rulli in the ninth minute of a 2–0 away win (as in the fixture six months earlier, he did not celebrate the goal).

On 27 February 2016, Griezmann scored the only goal as Atlético won away to Real Madrid. On 13 April, he scored both goals in a 2–0 quarter-final second leg win at the Vicente Calderón Stadium that knocked holders Barcelona out of the Champions League. On 3 May, he scored the decisive away goal against Bayern Munich in the semi-final second leg at the Allianz Arena to send Atlético to the final. Griezmann hit the crossbar with a penalty two minutes into the second half with his team trailing 1–0 against Real Madrid in the Champions League final at Milan's San Siro on 28 May. He scored in the penalty shootout after the match had ended 1–1 after extra time, but Atlético ultimately lost 5–3.

On 23 June 2016, Griezmann signed a new contract with Atlético, which would keep him at the club until 2021. On 1 November 2016, Griezmann scored both of Atlético's goals (with his second in the 93rd minute) in their 2–1 home win against Rostov in a 2016–17 Champions League Group D match (in which he was voted the Player of the Match) to enable Atlético to progress to the round of 16 with two matches to spare. On 22 April 2017, he scored the only goal of a win at RCD Espanyol, thus becoming the second Frenchman after Karim Benzema to score 100 La Liga goals, which he did in 247 games.

After another trophyless season, and amid speculation that he could leave Atlético for Manchester United after the conclusion of the 2016–17 season, he extended his contract at the club by one year in June 2017, after learning that Atlético was given a transfer ban and that it could not sign a replacement. His reported release price was also raised to €100 million (£87 million).

2017–18: UEFA Europa League win

On 19 August 2017, Griezmann earned his first red card during a draw against Girona and received a two-match ban. He was initially booked for diving in the penalty box, then his reaction of using foul language toward the referee earned him a second booking. He was named La Liga Player of the Month for February 2018 after registering eight goals and two assists during the period, including scoring seven in four days (a hat-trick against Sevilla and four against Leganés). His second in the 4–0 win against the latter was his 100th goal for Atletico, becoming only the third player of the 21st century to do so, after Sergio Agüero and Fernando Torres.

He scored in the first leg of the 2017–18 UEFA Europa League semi-final away to Arsenal and assisted Diego Costa for the only goal in the return, contributing to Atléti 2–1 aggregate victory and progression to the final, held in Lyon and against French opposition in Marseille; he then scored twice in the final as his club claimed the trophy for the third time in nine years.

After months of speculation linking him with a €100 million (£88 million) move to Barcelona, which came after Atlético reported Barcelona to FIFA over an alleged illegal approach for Griezmann in December 2017, Griezmann signed a contract extension with Atlético on 19 June 2018 until 2023. This came days after he rejected a move to the Camp Nou. He wrote a message to Atlético on social media, "My fans, my team, MY HOME!!!" in Spanish, French and English along with a video in which he is seen walking around Madrid.

2018–19: Final season of first stint with Atlético
On 15 August, Griezmann started in Atlético's 4–2 extra-time win over Real Madrid in the 2018 UEFA Super Cup in Tallinn.

On Matchday 2 of the Champions League, Griezmann scored a goal in both halves to give his team a 3–1 home win over Belgian champions Club Brugge. Later on Matchday 4 he scored Atletico's second goal against German side Borussia Dortmund as Atletico Madrid won the reverse fixture at home by a 2–0 margin following a 4–0 defeat against the same opponents earlier in the competition at the Westfalenstadion. In the following game he again scored the second goal in a 2–0 win against French side Monaco, to ensure his team's qualification for the next round of the Champions League.

On 15 December, Griezmann played his 300th league contest in the Spanish top division, a game in which he scored twice while setting up another, as Atlético Madrid won 3–2 away to Real Valladolid. In the following week, he scored his 200th career goal, from the spot in a 1–0 win over Espanyol. On 26 January, in a league fixture at home against Getafe, he scored his 10th league goal of the season in a 2–0 win as Atlético closed the gap between league leaders Barcelona to just 2 points. On 10 February, he scored in a 3–1 derby defeat against Real Madrid, equalling Fernando Torres's record-which he later broke in the following week by scoring the only goal in a 1–0 win against Rayo Vallecano, to become the fifth highest goalscorer in Atlético history with 130 goals.

On 14 May 2019, Griezmann announced that he would be leaving Atlético Madrid after five seasons, after being heavily linked to Barcelona, who reportedly intended to pay the €120 million buy-out clause set by the club.

Barcelona

On 12 July 2019, Barcelona announced the signing of Griezmann to a five-year contract after activating his €120 million buy-out clause. Later that day, however, Atlético Madrid disputed Barcelona's deal to sign the player, stating that the fee paid falls €80 million short of his release clause, claiming that Griezmann had agreed to move to the Nou Camp before 1 July 2019, when his €200 million buy-out clause was lowered to €120 million. Atlético later stated they have "started the procedures it considers appropriate for the defense of its legitimate rights and interests" as a result of any deal, with reports in Spanish media suggesting the club planned to go to football's governing body FIFA to argue their case. On 14 July, he was presented at the Camp Nou and was handed the number 17 shirt, and made his debut in a pre-season friendly in Japan against Chelsea. On the same day, some Atlético Madrid fans defaced Griezmann's plaque outside the Wanda Metropolitano, as the club officially submitted a complaint to La Liga, whose president Javier Tebas later stated "it is possible to block [Griezmann's] transfer", but also noted "La Liga have [yet] to decide [the] course of action". The transfer was eventually upheld.

2019–21: Debut season and Copa del Rey 

Griezmann made his competitive debut on 16 August 2019 in a 1–0 defeat to Athletic Bilbao. On 25 August, Griezmann scored a brace and assisted during his home debut, which ended in a 5–2 win against Real Betis.
After substituting injured Ousmane Dembélé after 26 minutes of the first half, he scored his first Champions League goal for the club on 27 November 2019 in a 3–1 win against Borussia Dortmund, assisted by Lionel Messi. In their 2019–20 Supercopa de España match against Atlético Madrid, Griezmann scored his side's second goal against his former club in an eventual 2–3 defeat. Griezmann became the first player of the season to score in every major competition for Barcelona when he netted a brace in the Copa del Rey against Ibiza in a narrow 2–1 win. On 25 February 2020, Griezmann scored Barcelona's equalizer in their 1–1 Champions League round of 16 draw against Napoli, becoming the first Barcelona player other than Messi to score a Champions League away goal in the knockout stage since 2015.

On 1 November 2020, Griezmann scored his first goal of the 2020–21 season in a 1–1 away draw against Alavés. On 17 January 2021, Griezmann scored a brace in a 3–2 loss against Athletic Bilbao in the 2021 Supercopa de España Final. On 3 February, Griezmann scored and assisted twice as Barcelona made a comeback after being 2–0 down until the 88th minute to win 5–3 at the end of extra-time against Granada in the quarter-finals of the Copa del Rey. In the 2021 Copa del Rey Final, Griezmann scored the first goal in a 4–0 victory over Athletic Bilbao and won his first trophy with Barcelona.

Return to Atlético Madrid

2021–22 season
On 31 August 2021, Griezmann returned to Atlético Madrid on a one-year loan, with the option to extend the loan by a further year, and complete with a conditional permanent transfer clause worth €40 million to be activated by 2023.

He scored his first goal in his second spell at the club, in a 2–1 comeback victory away to Milan in the 2021–22 UEFA Champions League on 28 September. On 19 October in a Champions League group match against Liverpool at the Wanda Metropolitano, he scored a first half brace to level the score at 2–2, but was sent off in the 52nd minute for serious foul play on Roberto Firmino in an eventual 2–3 defeat.

2022–23 season
Atlético Madrid extended the loan of Griezmann for another year. Atlético were keen to re-buy Griezmann, but they didn't want to trigger the appearance based €40 million obligatory buy clause included in the loan. As a result Griezmann's game time was limited to 30 minutes, with him coming from the bench only after the 60 minute mark. On 7 September 2022, he scored the winning goal in the 90+11'th minute in the stoppage time in a 2–1 victory against Porto in the first match of the 2022–23 UEFA Champions League.

On 10 October 2022, Atlético Madrid reached an agreement with Barcelona over the transfer of Griezmann who signed a contract until 30 June 2026.

International career

Youth

Due to playing in Spain, Griezmann went unnoticed by several France youth international coaches. After his success with Real Sociedad, on 23 February 2010, he was named to the France under-19 team to play in two friendly matches against Ukraine. On 2 March, Griezmann made his youth international debut appearing in the team's 0–0 draw with Ukraine. In the return leg two days later, he scored the game-winning goal in the 88th minute to give France a 2–1 victory.

On 7 June 2010, Griezmann was named to coach Francis Smerecki's 18-man squad to participate in the 2010 UEFA European Under-19 Championship. In the tournament, he scored two goals and provided an assist in the team's second group stage match against Austria, a 5–0 win, as the national team eventually won the competition on home soil. He was named in the Team of the Tournament.

Due to France's victory at the UEFA Under-19 championship, the nation qualified for the 2011 FIFA U-20 World Cup, which merited under-20 team appearances for Griezmann. On 28 September 2010, he was called up to the team to participate in friendly matches against Portugal and the reserve team of Italian club Juventus. Griezmann, however, did not appear in either match due to being sent home early after suffering a thigh injury during a training session. The following month, despite still being eligible to appear at under-20 level, he was called up to the under-21 team by coach Erick Mombaerts as a replacement for the injured Gabriel Obertan to play in a friendly match against Russia. Griezmann made his under-21 debut in the match appearing as a second-half substitute in a 1–0 defeat.

After appearing in two matches with the under-21 team, Griezmann returned to under-20 level and made his debut with the team on 9 February 2011 in a 2–1 victory over England at the New Meadow, assisting Clément Grenier's equaliser. On 10 June 2011, he was named to the 21-man squad to participate in the U-20 World Cup. He made his debut in the competition on 30 July 2011 in the team's 4–1 defeat to the hosts Colombia. On 10 August, in France's Round of 16 match against Ecuador, Griezmann scored the game-winning goal in a 1–0 victory.

In November 2012, Griezmann was suspended, along with four other youth players, from France's national teams until 31 December 2013 for disciplinary reasons regarding a late night out before training. During this time, he considered switching allegiance to his ancestral Portugal.

Senior

On 27 February 2014, Griezmann received a call-up to France's senior squad by coach Didier Deschamps to play in a friendly against the Netherlands at the Stade de France. He earned his first cap on 5 March, appearing as a starter in the 2–0 home win and playing the first 68 minutes.

2014 World Cup
On 13 May, he was named in Deschamps' squad for the 2014 FIFA World Cup. On 1 June, playing against Paraguay in Nice, he scored his first international goal for France, opening a 1–1 draw. He added two more as a late substitute for Olivier Giroud in France's final warm-up match, against Jamaica on 8 June, the final two in an 8–0 win. On 15 June, he was selected to start in France's first match of the World Cup, replacing the injured Franck Ribéry on the left side of Les Bleus attack as they defeated Honduras 3–0 in Porto Alegre. In the last 16 against Nigeria, his pressure led to Joseph Yobo scoring a late own goal for a 2–0 French victory. France were eliminated in the quarter-finals by eventual champions Germany.

Euro 2016
Griezmann was chosen for France as they hosted UEFA Euro 2016, and started the opening game, a 2–1 win over Romania. For their performances, he and Paul Pogba were benched for the next game against Albania at the Stade Vélodrome; Griezmann came on in place of Giroud in the second half and headed Adil Rami's cross with the first shot on target in the last minute to open a 2–0 win. In the last 16 against the Republic of Ireland in Lyon, he scored twice as the French recovered from a half-time deficit to win 2–1, and was also fouled by Shane Duffy who was given a straight red card.

On 3 July, Griezmann assisted Pogba and Dimitri Payet before scoring himself in a 5–2 quarter-final win over Iceland; it was his first goal at the Stade de France. In the semi-finals against the country of his father's birth, Germany, four days later, he scored twice in a 2–0 victory to lead France to their third European Championship final. Following a 1–0 defeat to Portugal in the final on 10 July, Griezmann won the Golden Boot as the tournament's top scorer, with six goals and two assists in seven games, and was named the tournament's best player, also being named to the team of the tournament. His tally of six goals at the tournament was second only to the nine goals by compatriot Michel Platini at UEFA Euro 1984.

2018 World Cup

On 17 May 2018, Griezmann was called up to the France squad for the 2018 FIFA World Cup in Russia. On 16 June 2018, he suffered a foul in the box and scored the resulting penalty kick to open the score in France's 2–1 over Australia in their opening match at the tournament, which was the first penalty decision ever to be awarded in a World Cup match with the assistance of the video assistant referee system. On 30 June, Griezmann scored a goal from the penalty kick given for a foul on Kylian Mbappé in a 4–3 victory over Argentina in their round of 16 match.

In France's 2–0 victory over Uruguay in quarter-finals of the tournament on 6 July, Griezmann first assisted Raphaël Varane's goal from a corner and later scored a goal himself with a strike from outside the area following an error by Uruguayan goalkeeper Fernando Muslera. Griezmann did not celebrate his goal against Uruguay out of respect for his Uruguayan mentor and Uruguayan club teammates. In the semi-final against Belgium at the Krestovsky Stadium, Saint Petersburg on 10 July, he set up the only goal of the game from a corner, which was headed in by Samuel Umtiti.

On 15 July, Griezmann was involved in several goals in the final against Croatia, which France won 4–2. With the score at 0–0 in the first half, France was awarded a foul on Griezmann after a challenge from Marcelo Brozović. Commentators called that Griezmann had dived as he began falling before Brozović made contact. Griezmann took the ensuing  free kick, which was headed by Mario Mandžukić into his own net to give France the lead in the 18th minute. Croatia equalized, but Griezmann scored a 38th-minute penalty after the referee ruled for handball (via a video assistant review) to give France a 2–1 lead. In the second half, he passed to Paul Pogba in the build-up to the midfielder scoring the third goal for France. For his efforts, Griezmann was named man of the match, and was also voted the third best player in the tournament behind Luka Modrić and Eden Hazard, receiving the Bronze Ball.

2018–19 UEFA Nations League
On Matchday 3 of the UEFA Nations League, Griezmann scored a second half brace as the world champions came from behind to beat Germany 2–1 in Paris.

Euro 2020
In May 2021, he received a call-up for the postponed UEFA Euro 2020. On 19 June, he scored a goal in a 1–1 draw against Hungary.

2020–21 UEFA Nations League

He was part of the national team which won the 2021 UEFA Nations League Finals.

2022 World Cup
In November 2022, he was included in the French squad for the 2022 FIFA World Cup in Qatar. On 14 December, he was named man of the match in a 2–0 win over Morocco in the semi-finals. Although France lost to Argentina in the final by penalties after a 3–3 draw, Griezmann finished the tournament as co-top assister with three assists.

Player profile

Style of play
A quick, modern, and versatile left-footed forward, with an eye for goal, Griezmann has been described as a "team player", and is capable of occupying several offensive positions in or behind the main attacking line, due to his technical skills, vision, ability to drop deep and link-up play between the forwards and midfielders, or score many goals: he has been deployed as a main striker, in a central role as an attacking midfielder, as a second striker, as a false 9, or as a winger, on either flank. Griezmann is an accurate finisher with either foot from both inside and outside the area, and is also good in the air and accurate with his head, in spite of his relatively small stature.

In addition to his ability to score and create goals, he has also been praised for his work-rate, attacking movement, positional sense, and ability to interpret the game, which, combined with his pace, mobility and energy, enables him to make effective attacking runs to beat the defensive line. He has been noted by various sources as having a comparatively low rate of scoring from penalties.

Reception 
UEFA chief technical officer Ioan Lupescu, who led the panel of technical observers that named Griezmann as the best player of Euro 2016, said that he "works hard for his team and possesses technique, vision and quality finishing" and branded him "a threat in every game he played". While his club form for Barcelona remained sub-par, Griezmann's performances for the France national team prompted head coach Didier Deschamps to label him "one of the greatest players of all-time".

Outside football

Personal life
Since 2011, Griezmann has been in a relationship with Erika Choperena, a Spanish native of the Basque Country. They got married on 15 June 2017. They had their first child, a daughter, in April 2016. The couple's second child was born in April 2019. In April 2021, the couple had their third child, a daughter; all three siblings share the same birthday. Griezmann is Catholic.

Griezmann's sister was a survivor of the siege of the Bataclan theatre in the November 2015 Paris attacks, which took place as he was playing against Germany at the Stade de France, which was also site of an explosion in the same attacks.

Since Griezmann's time with Real Sociedad, he developed a strong affection for the country of Uruguay. His love for the country can be traced back to Real Sociedad with head coach Martín Lasarte and teammate Carlos Bueno, who are both Uruguayan. Bueno said of Griezmann's love for Uruguay, "With him I began watching games everyday, he became fond of Uruguay and watched all Peñarol matches." In the FIFA 2018 World Cup, Griezmann scored a goal that helped knock Uruguay out of the quarterfinal. Griezmann commented, "I did not want to celebrate on the pitch. I am very happy, but also sad for my [Atletico] teammates. It was my first time against Uruguay, so there was plenty of emotion."

Antoine's father became the president of UF Mâconnais in 2020, the club for which Antoine played in his youth.

Media and sponsorships
Griezmann has a sponsorship deal with German sportswear company Puma, and has appeared in commercials for the company. His 'Hotline Bling' goal celebration features in a 2016 Puma commercial. Puma unveiled Griezmann's own custom made football boots, PUMA Future 18.1 "Grizi", in December 2017.

Griezmann features in EA Sports' FIFA video game series: he appears on the cover of the French edition of FIFA 16 alongside global cover star Lionel Messi, having been selected for the role by public vote. Ahead of Euro 2016, Griezmann featured in advertisements for Beats Electronics headphones, alongside Harry Kane, Mario Götze and Cesc Fàbregas. He has a dancemove named after him in the popular French novelty song "Logobitombo (Corde à sauter)".

Griezmann is a brand ambassador for Head & Shoulders shampoo and Gillette, and has featured in several football themed television commercials. In 2017 he became a global brand ambassador for Chinese technology company Huawei; however, in December 2020, Griezmann formally cut ties with the company, citing "strong suspicions that [Huawei] has contributed to the development of a 'Uighur alert' thanks to facial recognition software".

Griezmann became the brand ambassador for Yu-Gi-Oh! trading card games on 6 June 2021. Originally, a special card inspired by him would be released later the year. However, following the video where Griezmann was seen laughing at derogatory racial comments made by teammate Ousmane Dembélé surfaced online in July 2021, Konami announced they had terminated Griezmann's contract as the brand ambassador.

Grizi Esport 
In January 2020, Griezmann launched the esports organization, Grizi Esport. The organization has acquired Rainbow Six Siege, Fortnite, and FIFA players. On 11 October 2021, it was announced by Grizi Esport that the organisation would "Stop momentarily with all of their Esports-related activities." As of December 2022, the organisation has not posted an update regarding the future of Grizi Esport.

Controversies
On 17 December 2017, Griezmann caused controversy by sharing a photo of himself dressed as a Harlem Globetrotter on his social media accounts; the outfit included blackface and an afro wig. After severe criticism, Griezmann deleted the posts and made an apology, saying "I admit it is awkward on my part. I am sorry if I have offended anyone."

In July 2021, video footage of Griezmann along with teammate Ousmane Dembélé circulated online, whereby he was seen laughing at derogatory racial comments made by Dembélé against the Asian technicians in their hotel room. As the technicians appeared to be troubleshooting the room's television, Dembélé made comments towards Griezmann in French, stating "All these ugly faces, just so you can play PES, aren't you ashamed?", continuing with "What kind of backward language is that?" before zooming in while laughing on one of the technicians faces, mentioning "Are you technologically advanced in your country or not?"
Griezmann has since apologized for the video on Twitter, but denied accusations of racism, saying "I completely refute the accusations against me and I am sorry if I have offended my Japanese friends. I have always engaged against all forms of discrimination. For a couple of days now some people want to pass me for a man that I am not."
The incident has caused Konami to terminate Griezmann's contract as the brand ambassador of Yu-Gi-Oh! trading card games, with the company stating "Konami Digital Entertainment believes, as is the philosophy of sports, that discrimination of any kind is unacceptable. We had announced Griezmann as our Yu-Gi-Oh! content ambassador, however in light of recent events we have decided to cancel the contract." Hiroshi Mikitani, the founder and CEO of Rakuten, which is the shirt main sponsor of FC Barcelona, has demanded a full explanation from the club. Griezmann has since apologized to Mikitani personally for the incident.

Career statistics

Club

International

France score listed first, score column indicates score after each Griezmann goal

Honours

Real Sociedad
Segunda División: 2009–10

Atlético Madrid
Supercopa de España: 2014
UEFA Europa League: 2017–18
UEFA Super Cup: 2018
UEFA Champions League runner-up: 2015–16

Barcelona
Copa del Rey: 2020–21

France U19
UEFA European Under-19 Championship: 2010

France
FIFA World Cup: 2018; runner-up: 2022
UEFA Nations League: 2020–21
UEFA European Championship runner-up: 2016

Individual
UEFA European Under-19 Championship Team of the Tournament: 2010
La Liga Best Player: 2015–16
La Liga Favorite player for the fans: 2015–16
La Liga Player of the Month: January 2015, April 2015, September 2016, March 2017, February 2018, December 2018
La Liga Team of the Season: 2014–15
Onze d'Or: 2014–15
UEFA La Liga Team of the Season: 2015–16
Trophées UNFP for Best French Player playing Abroad: 2016
UEFA Champions League Squad of the Season: 2015–16, 2016–17
UEFA Europa League Squad of the Season: 2017–18
UEFA Europa League Player of the Season: 2017–18
UEFA European Championship Player of the Tournament: 2016
UEFA European Championship Golden Boot: 2016
UEFA European Championship Team of the Tournament: 2016
UEFA Team of the Year: 2016
French Player of the Year: 2016
La Liga Fans' Five Star Player: 2016
FIFA World Cup Bronze Ball: 2018
FIFA World Cup Silver Boot: 2018
FIFA World Cup Fantasy Team: 2018
IFFHS Men's World Team: 2018

Orders
Knight of the Legion of Honour: 2018

References

External links

Profile at the Atlético Madrid website

1991 births
Living people
Sportspeople from Mâcon
Footballers from Bourgogne-Franche-Comté
French footballers
Association football wingers
Association football forwards
UF Mâconnais players
Real Sociedad footballers
Atlético Madrid footballers
FC Barcelona players
Segunda División players
La Liga players
France youth international footballers
France under-21 international footballers
France international footballers
2014 FIFA World Cup players
UEFA Euro 2016 players
2018 FIFA World Cup players
UEFA Euro 2020 players
2022 FIFA World Cup players
FIFA World Cup-winning players
UEFA Nations League-winning players
French expatriate footballers
Expatriate footballers in Spain
French expatriate sportspeople in Spain
French Roman Catholics
French people of German descent
French people of Portuguese descent
Chevaliers of the Légion d'honneur
FIFA Century Club